Jacinthe Maryse Pineau (born April 26, 1974) is a Canadian former competition swimmer and butterfly specialist who represented Canada at the 1992 Summer Olympics in Barcelona, Spain.  There she competed in the preliminary heats of the women's 200-metre butterfly, and finished 23rd overall.

References

External links
 
 
 

1974 births
Canadian female butterfly swimmers
Living people
Olympic swimmers of Canada
Sportspeople from Sherbrooke
Swimmers at the 1992 Summer Olympics